Elena Könz (born 12 September 1987, Guarda) is a Swiss snowboarder, competing in slopestyle.

Könz qualified for the 2014 Winter Olympics and showed the third result in her heat in the qualification round (the seventh best result in the qualification), directly qualifying for the final. In the final, she fell in both runs and was classified ninth.

Her best World Cup result finish and the only podium before the 2014 Olympics was the third-place finish in Copper Mountain on December 22, 2013.

Könz only learned to ride snowboard as a teenager.

References

External links
 
 Könz Sochi profile

Swiss female snowboarders
Olympic snowboarders of Switzerland
Snowboarders at the 2014 Winter Olympics
Snowboarders at the 2018 Winter Olympics
1987 births
Living people
21st-century Swiss women